The Ingush–Chechen fratricide incident on 13 September 2006 resulted in the death of eight police officers, and the wounding of a further 20 when Chechen and Ingush policemen fired on each other on the border between the republics.

A motorcade of Chechnya's OMON special police buses was shot at as it was leaving Ingushetia, heading home with an Ingush prisoner. The Chechen OMON Chief of Staff, Buvadi Dukhiyev, was mortally wounded in the shootout.

Isa Kostoyev, a former high-ranking prosecutor and Ingushetian senator in the Federation Council of Russia, issued a call to the Ingushetians to resist Chechen police raids.

See also
Grozny OMON fratricide incident

References

Conflicts in 2006
2006 in Russia
Battles of the Second Chechen War
Friendly fire incidents
Law enforcement in Russia
September 2006 events in Russia